Nasir Ahmed (born January 1, 1964, Dacca) is a Bangladeshi former cricketer who played in 7 ODIs from 1988 to 1990. He is one of the three best wicketkeepers to play for Bangladesh, Shafiq-ul-Haq and Khaled Mashud being the other two. After the retirement of Haque, the selectors tried a number of young keepers, and Nasir (commonly known as Nasu) emerged as the most competent one. After cementing his place in 1986, he was a regular in the national side until 1993.

He eventually lost his place mainly due to tactical reasons, not for any keeping deficiencies. With one day game becoming more and more competitive, the team required a wicketkeeper who can bat up the order. Other players fulfilled this criterion better than Nasu. After retiring from cricket as a player, Nasu continued to serve the game as a national selector.

External links
 http://www.thedailystar.net/magazine/2006/05/02/sports.htm

1964 births
Living people
Bangladesh One Day International cricketers
Bangladeshi cricketers
Wicket-keepers
Cricketers from Dhaka